Mesonoemacheilus triangularis or Nemacheilus periyarensis is a species of stone loach endemic to the Western Ghats in southern Karnataka, Kerala, and Tamil Nadu, India. It is a fairly common species occurring in streams with gravel, cobbles and bedrock with some sand as the substrate. This fish grows to a length of  SL and can be found in the aquarium trade.

References

External links

Nemacheilidae
Freshwater fish of India
Endemic fauna of the Western Ghats
Taxa named by Francis Day
Fish described in 1865
Taxobox binomials not recognized by IUCN